William Bakewell (May 2, 1908 – April 15, 1993) was an American actor who achieved his greatest fame as one of the leading juvenile performers of the late 1920s and early 1930s.

Early years
Bakewell was a native of Los Angeles, where he attended the Harvard School for Boys and Page Military Academy.

Career 
Bakewell began his film career as an extra in the silent movie Fighting Blood (1924) and appeared in some 170 films and television shows. He had supporting roles at the end of the silent era and reached the peak of his career around 1930. He is perhaps best remembered for playing German soldier Albert Kropp in All Quiet on the Western Front (1930) and Rodney Jordan, Joan Crawford's brother, in Dance, Fools, Dance (1931). He also co-starred in Gold Diggers of Broadway (1929). 

In 1933, Bakewell contributed to the founding of the Screen Actors Guild, and was the 44th of the original 50 members. He never achieved stardom after the Depression years, although he became familiar in dozens of films, including his short appearance as a mounted soldier in Gone with the Wind (1939) whom Scarlett O'Hara asks when the Yankee soldiers are coming to Atlanta.

During World War II, Bakewell served in the U.S. Army with the rank of second lieutenant. He was stationed at the 73rd Evacuation Hospital and at the Radio Section of the Special Service Division as the post intelligence officer. He also worked under the department that handled distribution of recorded programs to overseas station circuits.

He starred in the Columbia Pictures serial Hop Harrigan (1946), where he played a top Air Corps pilot. He also portrayed Major Tobias Norton and a Keelboat Race Master of Ceremonies in the phenomenally popular Disney series Davy Crockett (1954-1955).

In the 1960s, he guest-starred in numerous sitcoms, including Guestward, Ho!, The Tab Hunter Show, Pete and Gladys, Bringing Up Buddy, Mister Ed, Leave It to Beaver, The Jack Benny Program,  Petticoat Junction , and Hazel. He also was cast in episodes of Peter Gunn, Sea Hunt, Wagon Train, The Roaring 20s, The Virginian, Arrest and Trial, and 87th Precinct He played the Virginia statesman George Wythe in the episode "George Mason" in the 1965 NBC documentary series, Profiles in Courage. He made his last film in 1975. When his acting career declined he also opened a successful real estate company.

For four decades, Bakewell served on the board of Motion Picture and Television Fund.

Book 
Bakewell's autobiography Hollywood Be Thy Name--Random Recollections of a Movie Veteran From Silents to Talkies to TV was published in 1991.

Death
In 1993, at age 84, Bakewell died of leukemia in Los Angeles.

Partial filmography

 Fighting Blood (1923) - Minor Role (uncredited)
 A Regular Fellow (1925)
 The Last Edition (1925) - 'Ink' Donovan
 The Gilded Butterfly (1926) - Party Guest (uncredited)
 The Waning Sex (1926) - Minor Role (uncredited)
 Whispering Wires (1926) - (uncredited)
 Old Ironsides (1926) - Young Philadelphian (uncredited)
 Bertha, the Sewing Machine Girl (1926)
 The Heart Thief (1927) - Victor
 Mother (1927) - Jerry Ellis
 The Magic Flame (1927)
 The Shield of Honor (1927) - Jerry MacDowell
 West Point (1927) - 'Tex' McNeil
 The Latest from Paris (1928) - Bud Dolan
 The Devil's Trademark (1928) - Tom Benton
 Harold Teen (1928) - Percival
 The Battle of the Sexes (1928) - Billy Judson
 Annapolis (1928) - Skippy
 Lady of the Pavements (1929) - A Pianist
 The Iron Mask (1929) - Louis XIV / Twin Brother
 Hot Stuff (1929) - Mack Moran
 On with the Show (1929) - Jimmy/Performer in 'Bicycle Built for Two' Number
 Gold Diggers of Broadway (1929) - Wally
 Lummox (1930) - Paul Charvet
 Playing Around (1930) - Jack
 All Quiet on the Western Front (1930) - Albert Kropp
 The Bat Whispers (1930) - Brook
 Paid (1930) - Carney
 Reducing (1931) - Tommy Haverly
 The Great Meadow (1931) - Jack Jarvis (uncredited)
 Dance, Fools, Dance (1931) - Rodney Jordan
 Daybreak (1931) - Otto
 A Woman of Experience (1931) - Count Karl Runyi
 Politics (1931) - Benny Emerson
 Guilty Hands (1931) - Tommy Osgood
 The Spirit of Notre Dame (1931) - Jim Stewart
 Cheaters at Play (1932) - Maurice Perry
 While Paris Sleeps (1932) - Paul Renoir
 Back Street (1932) - Richard Saxel - Walter's Son
 The Secret of Madame Blanche (1933) - Minor Role (scenes deleted)
 Lucky Devils (1933) - Slugger Jones
 Three-Cornered Moon (1933) - Douglas Rimplegar
 A Man of Sentiment (1933) - John Russell
 Straightaway (1933) - Billy Dawson
 You Can't Buy Everything (1934) - Donny 'Don' Bell as a man
 The Quitter (1934) - Russell Tilford
 Speed Wings (1934) - Jerry
 Green Eyes (1934) - Cliff Miller
 Straight Is the Way (1934) - Dr. Wilkes
 The Party's Over (1934) - Clay
 The Curtain Falls (1934) - Barry Graham
 Crimson Romance (1934) - Adolph
 Sons of Steel (1934) - Roland Chadburne
 Laddie (1935) - Robert Pryor
 On Probation (1935) - Bill Coleman
 Strangers All (1935) - Dick Carter
 Manhattan Butterfly (1935) - Stevens aka Stephen Collier
 Together We Live (1935) - Billy
 Happiness C.O.D. (1935) - Ken Sherridan
 Lady Luck (1936) - Dave Haines
 Sea Spoilers (1936) - Lieut. Commander Mays
 Quality Street (1937) - Lt. Spicer (uncredited)
 Mile-a-Minute-Love (1937) - Bob Jackson
 Dangerous Holiday (1937) - Tom Wilson
 Jungle Menace (1937) - Tom Banning
 Trapped by G-Men (1937) - Dick Withers
 Exiled to Shanghai (1937) - Andrew
 The Higgins Family (1938) - Eddie Davis
 The Duke of West Point (1938) - Committee Captain
 King of the Turf (1939) - Intern
 Hotel Imperial (1939) - Cadet (uncredited)
 Zenobia (1939) - Townsman at Zeke's Recitation (uncredited)
 Those High Grey Walls (1939) - Kibitzer (uncredited)
 Gone with the Wind (1939) - Mounted Officer
 Beyond Tomorrow (1940) - David Chadwick
 The Saint Takes Over (1940) - Shipboard Card Player (uncredited)
 Seven Sinners (1940) - Ensign
 Cheers for Miss Bishop (1941) - Jim Forbes (uncredited)
 Dr. Kildare's Victory (1942) - Mr. Hubbell
 The Dawn Express (1942) - Tom Fielding
 I Live on Danger (1942) - Mac
 The Postman Didn't Ring (1942) - Robert Harwood Jr.
 The Loves of Edgar Allan Poe (1942) - Hugh Pleasant
 King of the Mounties (1942) - Cpl. Hall Ross
 Submarine Alert (1943) - Agent Pomeroy - Fleming's Aide (uncredited)
 Yanks Ahoy (1943) - Ens. Crosby (uncredited)
 Hop Harrigan America's Ace of the Airways (1946) - Hop Harrigan
 The Fabulous Dorseys (1947) - Eddie
 The Farmer's Daughter (1947) - Windor
 The Trespasser (1947) - Bruce Coleman, the Literary Editor
 The Bachelor and the Bobby-Soxer (1947) - Winters
 Messenger of Peace (1947) - Pastor Willie von Adel
 King of the Bandits (1947) - Captain Frank Mason
 Arthur Takes Over (1948) - Lawrence White
 So This Is New York (1948)
 Romance on the High Seas (1948) - Dudley
 Night Wind (1948) - Capt. Kingston (uncredited)
 Miraculous Journey (1948) - (uncredited)
 You Gotta Stay Happy (1948) - Dick Hebert
 The Capture (1950) - Tolin
 Oh! Susanna (1951) - Lieutenant (uncredited)
 Wells Fargo Gunmaster (1951) - Charlie Lannon
 When the Redskins Rode (1951) - Appleby
 Come Fill the Cup (1951) - Hal Ortman
 Radar Men from the Moon (1952) - Ted Richards
 Room for One More (1952) - Milkman (scenes deleted)
 So This Is Love (1953) - Charles, Waiter (uncredited)
 Lucky Me (1954) - Jaguar Owner (uncredited)
 Davy Crockett, King of the Wild Frontier (1955) - Maj. Tobias Norton (archive footage)
 Official Detective (1958, TV Series) - Sam Graves
 Hell's Five Hours (1958) - Minor Role (uncredited)
 Johnny Rocco (1958) - Joe, Police Scientist (uncredited)
 Sea Hunt - Episode Monte Cristo (1958)
 The Big Fisherman (1959) - Minor Role (uncredited)
 Not with My Wife, You Don't! (1966) - Brig. Gen. Swift (uncredited)
 Bonanza (1967-1968, TV Series) - Henshaw / Slatter (2 episodes)
 The Strongest Man in the World (1975) - Professor

Further reading
William Bakewell (1991), Hollywood Be Thy Name: Random Recollections of a Movie Veteran From Silents to Talkies to TV

See also

References

External links

1908 births
1993 deaths
American male film actors
American male silent film actors
American male television actors
Deaths from leukemia
Deaths from cancer in California
20th-century American male actors
Male actors from Los Angeles